Ala Nemerenco (born 21 August 1959) is a Moldovan physician and politician. , she serves as Minister of Health in the cabinet of Prime Minister Natalia Gavrilița.

She served as Minister of Health, Labour and Social Protection from 8 June 2019 to 14 November 2019 in the cabinet of Prime Minister Maia Sandu. Viorica Dumbrăveanu was appointed as her successor.

References

Living people
1959 births
21st-century Moldovan politicians
Women government ministers of Moldova
21st-century Moldovan women politicians
Moldovan Ministers of Health